Philydraceae is a family of flowering plants composed of three genera and a total of six known species.  Such a family has not been recognized by many taxonomists.

The APG II system, of 2003 (unchanged from the APG system, of 1998), does recognize such a family and places it in the order Commelinales, in the clade commelinids, in the monocots.  It consists of only very few species of perennial, tropical plants in Southeast Asia and Australia.

References

External links 
 
 NCBI Taxonomy Browser
 links at CSDL
 Philydrella drummondii in Western Australia
 Philydrella pygmaea in Western Australia
 Philydrum lanuginosum in Western Australia

 
Commelinid families